The 2001 All-Ireland Intermediate Hurling Championship was the 18th staging of the All-Ireland hurling championship. The championship began on 27 May 2001 and ended on 29 October 2001.

Tipperary were the defending champions, however, they were defeated in the provincial championship. Cork won the title after defeating Wexford by 2-17 to 2-8 in the final.

Results

All-Ireland Intermediate Hurling Championship

Semi-finals

Final

References

Intermediate
All-Ireland Intermediate Hurling Championship